The Bank of Finland is the central bank of Finland and today the bank is a member of the European System of Central Banks. It views itself as the fourth oldest surviving central bank in the world, after Sweden's Riksbank, the Bank of England, and the Bank of France. Until 1999, the national central bank was responsible for the former Finnish currency, the markka. Finland adopted the euro on 1 January 1999, with markka coins and banknotes continuing in use (as denominations of the euro) until 1 January 2001.

History

The precursor of Bank of Finland, Waihetus-, Laina- ja Depositioni-Contori Suomen Suuren-ruhtinaanmaassa (The Exchange, Loan and Deposit Office of the Grand Duchy of Finland), was established on 1 March 1812 in the city of Turku by Alexander I of Russia. In 1819 it was relocated to Helsinki. Until 1840 the main purpose of the bank was to carry out currency reform to introduce Imperial ruble. The Bank created and regulated the Finnish Markka from its inauguration in 1860 until Finland adopted the euro in 1999.

Mandate, ownership and organization

The Bank of Finland is Finland's central bank and a member of the European System of Central Banks and of the Eurosystem. It is Finland's monetary authority, and is responsible for the country's currency supply and foreign exchange reserves.

The Bank of Finland is owned by the Republic of Finland and governed by the Finnish Parliament, through the Parliamentary Supervisory Council and the Board of the bank. The Board is responsible for the administration of the bank, and the Parliamentary Supervisory Council for supervising the administration and activities of the bank and for other statutory tasks. The bank is governed under the provisions of the Act on the Bank of Finland, passed in 1998.

The bank has branch offices in Kuopio, Tampere, and Oulu. The bank has a staff of about 380 persons.

The highest official in the bank is the Governor (currently Olli Rehn) who also chairs the board. Members of the Board in August 2018 were Olli Rehn (Governor), Marja Nykänen (Deputy Governor) and Tuomas Välimäki.

BOFIT

 is an internal think tank of the Bank of Finland, which has historically been driven by the imperative for Finland to gain a granular understanding of the economic situation of Russia. The full name has changed over the years, until 2021 as "Bank of Finland Institute for Economies in Transition" and since November 2021 as "Bank of Finland Institute for Emerging Economies".

Governors of the Bank of Finland

Claes Johan Sacklén 1812–1816
Carl Johan Idman 1817–1820
Otto Herman Lode 1820–1827
Johan Gustaf Winter 1827–1841
Carl Wilhelm Trapp 1841–1853
Axel Ludvig Born 1853–1856
Alex Federley 1853–1854
Robert Trapp 1854–1856
Frans Ivar Edelheim 1856–1858
Wilhelm Blidberg 1858–1861
Carl Isak Björkman 1862–1866
Victor von Haartman 1866–1870
August Florin 1870–1875
Gustaf Samuel von Troil 1875–1884
Alfred Charpentier 1884–1897
Theodor Wegelius 1898–1906
Clas Herman von Collan 1907–1918
Otto Stenroth 1918–1923
August Ramsay 1923–1924
Risto Ryti 1923–1940
Johan Wilhelm Rangell 1943–1944
Risto Ryti 1944–1945
Sakari Tuomioja 1945–1955
Rainer von Fieandt 1955–1957
Klaus Waris 1957–1967
Mauno Koivisto 1968–1982
Ahti Karjalainen 1982–1983
Rolf Kullberg 1983–1992
Sirkka Hämäläinen 1992–1998
Matti Vanhala 1998–2004 (retired early due to illness)
Erkki Liikanen 2004–2018
Olli Rehn 2018–
Source:

Chairmen of the Parliamentary Supervisory Council
 Antti Lindtman (2019–present)
 Matti Vanhanen (2015–2019)
 Ben Zyskowicz (2011–2015)
 Timo Kalli (2008–2011)
 Seppo Kääriäinen (2007–2008)
 Mari Kiviniemi (2006–2007)
 Olavi Ala-Nissilä (2003–2006)
 Mauri Pekkarinen (2003)
 Ilkka Kanerva (1995–2003)
 Sauli Niinistö (1995)
 Pentti Mäki-Hakola (1991–1995)
 Erkki Pystynen (1990–1991)
 Mauri Miettinen (1987–1990)
 Matti Jaatinen (1979–1987)
 Harri Holkeri (1971–1979)
 Juha Rihtniemi (−1971)
 Veikko Kokkola 
 Juho Niukkanen
 Erik von Frenckell

See also

Economy of Finland
Finnish Financial Supervisory Authority
Finnish mark

References

External links

  Bank of Finland official site
 Postage stamp commemorating the 150th anniversary of the Bank of Finland 1811–1961
 All the Finnish BIC-codes and an IBAN counter for all Finnish banks

Banks of Finland
Suomen
Finland
Banks established in 1812
1812 establishments in Finland
Kruununhaka